Kepa Akixo, aka Zigor, is a Spanish artist.

Zigor may also refer to:

Zigor (opera)
Zigor Goikuria (1979), known simply as Zigor 
Zigor Aranalde (1973)